Stephen Kamper (born in Sydney) is an Australian politician who was elected to the New South Wales Legislative Assembly as the member for Rockdale for the Labor Party at the 2015 New South Wales state election.

Political career
With the retirement of Frank Sartor in the seat of Rockdale at the 2011 New South Wales state election, Labor's national executive selected Kamper as the candidate, causing friction with the local branch. John Flowers of the Liberal Party won the seat in its landslide victory.

Three years later in March 2014, a rank and file ballot was conducted to determine the candidate but Mr Kamper was the only nominee. At the 2015 election, Kamper won back the seat for Labor. He is currently the opposition's joint head of the Waste Watch committee.

Personal life
Kamper is married to Magda and together they have five children and four grandsons. He attended Sans Souci Public School and James Cook Boys High School in Kogarah and prior to entering the parliament was a senior partner in Kamper Chartered Accountants.

References

External links
 

Living people
Politicians from Sydney
Australian Labor Party members of the Parliament of New South Wales
Members of the New South Wales Legislative Assembly
Year of birth missing (living people)
21st-century Australian politicians